Sunday Live was a Sunday morning regional current affairs programme, broadcast on Scottish TV in Central Scotland and Grampian TV in the North (now both known as STV).

Stephen Jardine, a former Scotland Today newsreader (later co-host of STV's The Hour), fronted the programme, interviewing some of Scotland's best-known public figures and politicians. Louise White filled in for Stephen when he was away. A second series was planned for the Autumn of 2006, although the show never returned.

References

External links
Sunday Live at stv.tv

Politics of Scotland
STV News
2000s Scottish television series
2006 Scottish television series debuts